Royal Oak Neighborhood Schools or Royal Oak School District (ROSD) is a school district in Greater Detroit, Michigan. The district provides public school services for the municipality of Royal Oak and the easternmost portion of Berkley. The official name is School District of the City of Royal Oak.

Schools
Secondary schools
 Royal Oak High School
 Royal Oak Middle School

Primary schools
 Jane Addams Elementary School
Also Addams Early Childhood Center
 Helen Keller Elementary School
 Northwood Elementary School
 Oakland Elementary School(oldest in school district)
 Oak Ridge Elementary School
 Upton Elementary School

Alternative school
 Winston Churchill Community Education Center
Formerly Winston Churchill Elementary (later middle school) school

Former schools
 Union School (all grades; razed)
Subsequently the site of Washington Elementary School
 Grant Elementary (planned to open 2004, plans scrapped due to consolidation)
 Abraham Lincoln Elementary  (razed 2008)
Also Lincoln Early Childhood Center
 U. S. Grant Elementary (razed)
 Thomas Jefferson Elementary (sold and converted for use as a Comcast cable TV download station)
 George Washington Elementary  (sold to Oakland Community College and later razed)
 Benjamin Franklin Elementary (razed 2004)
 Edwin Starr Elementary (razed 2008)
 Ezra Parker Elementary (razed 2004)
 Edmund Lockman Elementary (razed 2015, used as storage due to being connected to Keller)
 Henry Wadsworth Longfellow Elementary (razed 2008)
 Mark Twain Elementary (razed 2008)
 Ralph Waldo Emerson Elementary (razed 2016, used as administrative offices)
 John Greenleaf Whittier Elementary (razed 2008)
 Northwood Elementary (replaced by new Northwood School, demolished 2008)
 Jane Addams Junior High (consolidated, now Addams Elementary/Addams Early Childhood Center)
 Clara Barton Junior High (razed)
 Helen Keller Junior High (consolidated, now Keller Elementary)
 Mary Lyon Junior High (razed)
 George A. Dondero High School (consolidated)
 Clarence M. Kimball High School (consolidated)
 Student populations from Dondero High and Kimball High were consolidated as Royal Oak High School in the former Kimball High School. The former Dondero High became Royal Oak Middle School.

Notes

External links 

 http://www.rosd.k12.mi.us/portal/

School districts in Michigan
Education in Oakland County, Michigan